Sugo Dam  is a gravity dam located in Hyogo Prefecture in Japan. The dam is used for flood control. The construction of the dam was started on 2005 and completed in 2010.

See also
List of dams in Japan

References

Dams in Hyogo Prefecture